21st Century Democrats is an American political organization founded by Senator Tom Harkin, commentator Jim Hightower and Congressman Lane Evans to help elect "progressive candidates.”

Background 
21st Century Democrats started out relatively small, surpassing $1M in contributions for the first time in the 1996 election cycle. By the 2004 election cycle, according to the Political Money Line, it was the 13th largest Political Action Committee (PAC) in the United States raising nearly $7 Million. Among progressive ideological PACs, it ranked fourth behind America Coming Together, EMILY's List, and MoveOn.org. However, since 2004 its contributions have gradually fallen, to under $2.2M in 2010 and under $1.2M in 2014.

Unlike traditional PACs, 21st Century Democrats focuses on recruiting, training, and hiring field organizers to organize grassroots campaigns on behalf of candidates for local offices, statewide office, and even targeted presidential swing states. The group has ties to Democracy for America, which grew out of Howard Dean's presidential campaign.

Partner organizations
In 2009, 21st Century Democrats joined Service Employees International Union, MoveOn.org, and Daily Kos in a new effort called Accountability Now PAC. This new Political Action Committee promised to use party primaries to challenge Democratic incumbents that PAC members do not support.

See also 

 Democracy for America

References

External links 
 

United States political action committees
Democratic Party (United States) organizations
Organizations established in 1986
Progressive organizations in the United States
Political advocacy groups in the United States
1986 establishments in the United States